Robinsonekspedisjonen 2011, is the eleventh season of the Norwegian version of the Swedish show Expedition Robinson. This season will premiere in early September. The main twist this season is that the contestants will be divided into two tribes known as Gamle (Old) and Unge (Young) based on their ages with those in Gamle being age forty and up and those in Unge being under the age of thirty.

Finishing order

External links
(Official Site)

Robinsonekspedisjonen seasons